Le Male is a men's fragrance created by Francis Kurkdjian for Jean Paul Gaultier in 1995. It has been manufactured by Puig since 2016, and was previously manufactured by Shiseido subsidiary Beauté Prestige International from 1995 until 2015. The fragrance was developed as a counterpart to the women's fragrance Classique, which was introduced in 1993.

A number of flanker fragrances have since been released on the strength of the Le Male name. The most recent fragrance, Le Male On Board, was launched in 2021.

Conception and scent

Le Male is described as an oriental fougere men's fragrance, a classification which is identified by the combination of "warm, woody, and spicy notes" and aromatic notes. The fragrance contains top notes of artemisia, mint, cardamom, and bergamot; middle notes of lavender, orange blossom, cinnamon, and cumin; and base notes of sandalwood, vanilla, cedar, tonka bean, and amber. Kurkdjian stated that the fragrance was simple to develop because "with vanilla, you don't have to be as technical, whereas floral fragrances are very complex and very difficult to pull off."

Kurkdjian described the Le Male bottle, a male torso wearing a marinière, as "a motif to put it in the 'Gaultier universe'" that represents "[Gaultier's] idea of what men are about – being seductive, being sexual, [and] being adventurous." The fragrance is packaged in an aluminum can, a motif Gaultier has used in his collections since 1980. Kurkdjian recalled believing that the fragrance "[was] not going to work at all" upon seeing the overall packaging because "the bottle not looking like a bottle" was "very unconventional" in the 1990s.

Release and impact
Shiseido subsidiary Beauté Prestige International distributed Jean Paul Gaultier fragrances, including Le Male from launch in 1995, through a license agreement that was to extend from 1991 through June 30, 2016. On January 1, 2016, Puig acquired the fragrance license from Shiseido for $79.2 million and compensated the early termination of the license for $22.6 million. With this purchase, Puig now holds control of both the fashion and fragrance divisions of the Jean Paul Gaultier brand. A new advertising campaign was premiered in Paris during a relaunch party held by Puig on January 28, 2016, in which a joint commercial for Le Male and Classique retains the "Casta diva" aria from the original commercial and American model Chris Bunn portrays the male sailor.

Le Male has since been regarded as a classic men's fragrance by a number of publications, including Forbes, GQ, and Men's Health. Graeme Campbell from Highsnobiety wrote that "like Polo Sport, Diesel Plus Plus, and Versace Blue Jeans, [Le Male] was one of those scents that was simply everywhere at the time [for] anyone who grew up in the '90s or early '00s"; he added that "along with unisex newcomers such as CK One, it blindsided a market dominated by beefier, more masculine fragrances [and] was sexy and fell right in line with the '90s 'metrosexual,' so much that it wasn’t uncommon for women to wear it".

The brand's fragrance general manager Thomas James acknowledged Le Male and Classique as "the flagship of the brand [that] represent all the Jean Paul Gaultier values [and will] continue to be an emblematic and historical pillar" at the launch of the women's fragrance Scandal in 2017.

Products
 Eau de toilette spray – 2.5 fl oz (75 ml)
 Eau de toilette spray – 4.2 fl oz (125 ml)
 Eau de toilette spray – 6.7 fl oz (200 ml)
 Aftershave balm – 3.4 fl oz (100 ml)
 Aftershave lotion – 4.2 fl oz (125 ml)
 Deodorant – 2.5 oz (75 ml)

Flanker fragrances

 Indicates repackaging of the original fragrance

References

History of cosmetics
20th-century perfumes
Products introduced in 1995